The Toronto subway system's rolling stock consists of 880 subway cars for Line 1 Yonge–University, Line 2 Bloor–Danforth, and Line 4 Sheppard and 28 intermediate-capacity rapid transit cars for Line 3 Scarborough. The rolling stock is owned and maintained by the Toronto Transit Commission (TTC).

Subway trains

 All TTC subway cars are equipped with flip-up seats located in each car (near the operator's cab), which can accommodate mobility devices such as wheelchairs, strollers, scooters, and bicycles, the new Toronto Rocket trains have two designated areas in each car with automatic flip-up seats, although level boarding platforms allow a degree of access to all trains.

Toronto Rocket

The Toronto Rocket (TR) is the newest version of TTC subway trains, which is operated on Lines 1 and 4. Its design deviates from its predecessors, which were formed by building trains from married pairs of identical cars. The trains consist of six cars for Line 1 and four cars for Line 4, both of which are connected with open gangways, similar to Bombardier's Movia family of metro trains. They only have two full-width operator cabs per trainset (as opposed to one on the right-hand corner of every subway car on the older versions), greater accessibility options and the skin of the train is welded rather than the previously used riveting method.  The TRs' exterior front and rear destination and train run number signs are outfitted with digital orange LED boards, while all previous TTC train models use back-lit roller signs.

The first of the new TR trains was scheduled to be delivered in late 2009, but in early 2010, TTC officials stated that the new trains would not enter service until late 2010. The first train arrived on TTC property in October 2010, and entered revenue service on July 21, 2011.

Next-generation cars
In October 2022, the TTC issued a request for proposal for new subway trains, which are targeted to enter service between 2027 and 2033.

Gallery

Line 3 Scarborough trains
All units will be retired once line 3 closes circa 2023.

Work vehicles

Most subway work cars are painted yellow with the fleet number as RTXX. The exception are converted subway cars, which are not repainted (strips added) and have the RT fleet number replacing their former fleet number.

Current subway work vehicles

Retired

Note that RT35 and RT36 are mixed-matched (2004).

Track gauge

The TTC uses two different track gauges:

  – Line 3 Scarborough, which uses standard gauge
  – Subway

References

Rolling stock